The 2009 Indianapolis Grand Prix was the twelfth round of the 2009 Grand Prix motorcycle racing season. It took place on the weekend of August 28–30, 2009 at the Indianapolis Motor Speedway. The MotoGP race was won by Jorge Lorenzo.

MotoGP classification

250 cc classification

125 cc classification

Championship standings after the race (MotoGP)
Below are the standings for the top five riders and constructors after round twelve has concluded.

Riders' Championship standings

Constructors' Championship standings

 Note: Only the top five positions are included for both sets of standings.

References

Indianapolis motorcycle Grand Prix
Indianapolis
Indianapolis motorcycle Grand Prix
Indy Indiana